Novoselskoye is a rural locality (a selo) and the administrative center of Novoselsky Selsoviet, Burlinsky District, Altai Krai, Russia. The population was 827 as of 2013. It was founded in 1968. There are 14 streets.

Geography 
Novoselskoye is located 27 km northwest of Burla (the district's administrative centre) by road. Bigeldy is the nearest rural locality.

References 

Rural localities in Burlinsky District